The 1964 NCAA University Division basketball tournament involved 25 schools playing in single-elimination play to determine the national champion of men's  NCAA Division I college basketball in the United States. It began on March 9, 1964, and ended with the championship game on March 21 in Kansas City, Missouri. A total of 29 games were played, including a third place game in each region and a national third place game.

UCLA, coached by John Wooden, won the national title with a 98–83 victory in the final game over Duke, coached by Vic Bubas. Walt Hazzard of UCLA was named the tournament's Most Outstanding Player. The title was the first in the history of the UCLA program, and was a sign of things to come as, the Bruins would win nine more championships in the next eleven seasons.

Locations 

For the ninth and final time, the Municipal Auditorium in Kansas City would host the Final Four. This would be the last tournament for the historic venue, which still stands in the city. Future games in the city would be held at Kemper Arena (which would hold the tenth and, to date, most recent Final Four in the city in 1988) and the Sprint Center. Municipal Auditorium was the only non-campus arena used in the tournament, which featured no new arenas, something that hadn't happened in the tournament since 1950 and would not happen again until 1989. Along with Municipal Auditorium, this was the last year which saw Williams Arena on the University of Minnesota campus host games. Future games in the Minneapolis would be held in the Hubert H. Humphrey Metrodome, its replacement, U.S. Bank Stadium (for the 2019 Final Four) and the Target Center (scheduled to host in 2021).

Teams

Bracket 
* – Denotes overtime period

East region

Mideast region

Midwest region

West region

Final Four

See also 
 1964 NCAA College Division basketball tournament
 1964 National Invitation Tournament
 1964 NAIA Division I men's basketball tournament

References 

NCAA Division I men's basketball tournament
Ncaa
Sports in Corvallis, Oregon
Basketball in the Dallas–Fort Worth metroplex
NCAA University Division basketball tournament
NCAA University Division basketball tournament